Bertolino is an Italian surname. Notable people with the surname include:

 Cláudio Bertolino (born 1963), Brazilian racewalker
 Enrique Bertolino (1912–1997), Argentine golfer
 James Bertolino (born 1942), American poet
 Jean Bertolino (born 1936), French journalist and writer
 John Bertolino (1914-2003), American photojournalist
 Mónica Bertolino (born 1957), Argentinean architect
 Damián González Bertolino (born 1980), Uruguayan writer

See also
 Bertolin
 Bertolini
 Barbera bianca